Aromobates leopardalis (common name: leopard rocket frog) is a species of frog in the family Aromobatidae. It is endemic to the Mérida of western Venezuela, with one population within the Sierra Nevada National Park. Its natural habitats are páramo grassland and sub-páramo shrubland environments and cloud forest. It is usually found within grasses and frailejones (Espeletia spp.), usually along and within streams.

This species has not been seen in at least a decade. Potential threats to it are introduced trout and possibly disease (chytridiomycosis); it shares its habitat with Atelopus mucubajiensis, another frog that has greatly declined.

References

leopardalis
Amphibians of the Andes
Amphibians of Venezuela
Endemic fauna of Venezuela
Páramo fauna
Taxa named by Juan A. Rivero
Taxonomy articles created by Polbot
Amphibians described in 1978